Batu Gajah Bypass or Jalan Bemban (Perak state route A108) is a highway bypass in Batu Gajah, Perak, Malaysia.

List of junctions

Roads in Perak
Highways in Malaysia